The Acera School (formerly the Anova School) is an independent, nonprofit, co-educational day school in Winchester, Massachusetts, United States, serving gifted students in grades K–11.

History
In 2010, Courtney Dickinson had spent a year as a volunteer facilitator trying to launch a gifted education program in Massachusetts public schools. Prompted by her family's challenges in finding suitable opportunities for gifted students, Dickinson created a school to help high ability students develop their potential. 

Dickinson founded "Anova: The Massachusetts School of Science, Creativity and Leadership". In September 2010, Anova opened in Melrose, leasing a portion of the vacant former Decius Beebe Elementary School building from Melrose Public Schools. 

Dickinson described Anova School's environment: "Kids really engage; they don't have a ceiling on their learning."

In 2011, Anova School was renamed Acera School, and when its lease expired, moved to the First Methodist Church's annex building.

In fall 2013, Acera re-opened for its fourth year in Winchester, in its own building at 5 Lowell Avenue.

Student body
The school serves "high-ability learners," including academically gifted/highly successful students, creative students, highly gifted/profoundly accelerated students, and twice-exceptional students who present both giftedness and disabilities. Acera requires that children take the WISC-IV assessment as part of the admissions process, as a precursor to a parent interview/visit.

In its first year, the Acera School offered three multi-age classrooms serving grades K–6. For the 2022–2023 school year, the school included a Lower Elementary class, 2 Intermediate Elementary classes, 3 Upper Elementary classes, and 3 Middle and High School classes.

By January 2020, Acera had enrolled 130 K–9 students. Acera initiated high school classes for grades nine and ten in the 2021–2022 school year. For the 2022–2023 school year, tuition at Acera was $31,900 for grades K–5, and $33,800 for grades 6–11, with limited financial aid available.

Curriculum

The Acera School curriculum is individualized for each student based on readiness and interests. Subjects such as math are taught in flexible cross-age groupings, with over a dozen math classes. The curriculum reflects the school's stated goals of "early and deep exposure to STEM topics and innovative fields, practice in creative and complex thinking and problem-solving". 

NPR reported,

Education Week described a "Global Collaboration Project" at Acera School:

Co-curricular activities 
The school started offering an after-school program in its second year, and its after school enrichment programs are now open to students not enrolled at Acera during the school day. Boston Magazine named Acera "Best of Boston 2022" for its after-school catalog of activities open to the public. Learning is interdisciplinary and project-based, with themes inspired by the Museum of Science Engineering's Elementary (EiE) program. Model United Nations, Theater, and LARP are some of the optional after-school activities as of 2022. 

Acera hosts the American Mathematics Competition AMC8 Exam each year along with the Noetic National Math Competition.

According to The Boston Globe, "Students at Acera: The Massachusetts School of Science, Creativity and Leadership in Winchester won first in the state and 15th internationally in the Purple Comet Math Meet. Approximately 2,800 teams from 55 countries participated. Purple Comet is a free, online, international math competition for high school and middle school students which has been conducted since 2003."

References

Educational institutions established in 2010
Buildings and structures in Winchester, Massachusetts
Private middle schools in Massachusetts
Private elementary schools in Massachusetts
2010 establishments in Massachusetts
Schools in Middlesex County, Massachusetts
Private high schools in Massachusetts